Hubert Ginn (born January 4, 1947) is a former professional American football player. He played in the National Football League for nine seasons as a running back for the Miami Dolphins, Baltimore Colts and the Oakland Raiders.  He was a member of two Super Bowl championship teams, the 1972 undefeated Dolphins and the 1976 Raiders.  

Ginn served as Miami's backup running back during their 1971 AFC championship season and their 1972 Super Bowl season.  Three games into the 1973 season he was traded to the Colts in exchange for fullback Don Nottingham and a 6th round draft choice.  Ginn had been unhappy with his limited playing time with the Dolphins, but received even less playing time with the Colts.  He suffered a bone chip in his toe during the season and refused a pain killer injection to be able to play on it.  He was waived by the Colts during the 1974 preseason and re-signed by the Dolphins.

After beginning the 1976 season on injured reserve for the Dolphins, Ginn was waived in October.  He was signed by the Raiders a few weeks later.  Ginn's career ended after becoming a free agent after the 1978 season.

References

External links
Just Sports Stats

1947 births
Living people
Players of American football from Savannah, Georgia
American football running backs
Florida A&M Rattlers football players
Miami Dolphins players
Baltimore Colts players
Oakland Raiders players